No Agua is an unincorporated community in Taos County, New Mexico, United States. It was also known as La Grande.

References
2. Chili Line written by John A. Gjev published 1971 [second edition]

Unincorporated communities in Taos County, New Mexico
Unincorporated communities in New Mexico